Heliophanus minor is a species of jumping spiders in the genus Heliophanus that lives in Kenya. It was first identified in 2016.

References

Endemic fauna of Kenya
Fauna of Kenya
Salticidae
Spiders of Africa
Spiders described in 2016
Taxa named by Wanda Wesołowska